Quercus gomeziana is a tree species in the beech family Fagaceae. There are no known subspecies.  It is placed in subgenus Cerris, section Cyclobalanopsis (the ring-cupped oaks).

This oak tree grows in evergreen seasonal tropical forest, has large acorns in up to 50 mm cupules. and has been recorded from Vietnam (especially Lam Dong Province), where it may be called sồi Gomez.

References

External links
 

gomeziana
Flora of Indo-China
Trees of Vietnam
Taxa named by Aimée Antoinette Camus